Nature's Gentleman is a 1918 British silent romance film directed by F. Martin Thornton and starring James Knight, Madge Stuart and Arthur M. Cullin.

Cast
 James Knight as James Davis  
 Madge Stuart as Lady Harcourt  
 Arthur M. Cullin as Sir Herbert Waring  
 Cameron Carr 
 Frank Petley
 Edna Moore 
 Frank Gerrard 
 Diane Moncrieff

References

Bibliography
 Low, Rachael. The History of the British Film 1914-1918. Routledge, 2005.

External links

1918 films
1910s romance films
British silent feature films
British romance films
1910s English-language films
Films directed by Floyd Martin Thornton
Films set in England
British black-and-white films
1910s British films